San Antonio Department is a department located in the Jujuy Province of Argentina.

References 

 

Departments of Jujuy Province